Ancient Faith Ministries (AFM) is a pan-Orthodox media ministry and department of the Antiochian Orthodox Christian Archdiocese of North America.   Alongside its sales division (Ancient Faith Store), it includes four media outlets: Ancient Faith Radio (AFR), Ancient Faith Publishing (AFP), Ancient Faith Blogs, and Ancient Faith Films.  It is headed by CEO John Maddex.

Overview
Ancient Faith Ministries is the product of a  merger of two previously independently existing ministries, Ancient Faith Radio and Conciliar Press, with other ministry divisions being added later. 

In , Conciliar Press merged with Ancient Faith Radio to form Conciliar Media Ministries, becoming fully a department of the Antiochian Archdiocese.

In , AFM launched Orthodox Christian Ebooks, a site dedicated to the sale of e-books from multiple publishers. 

On several occasions, AFM has received funding from the Virginia H. Farah Foundation, a non-profit foundation that supports development in the Orthodox Church.

References

External links
  (includes AFR content)
 
 
 

2008 establishments in Indiana
Antiochian Orthodox Church in the United States
Christian mass media companies
Companies based in Chesterton, Indiana
Eastern Orthodoxy in Indiana
Publishing companies established in 2008
Retail companies established in 2008